Sir Anthony Charles Galsworthy  (born 20 December 1944) is a retired British diplomat (former ambassador to China) and amateur naturalist.

Education
Galsworthy was educated at St Paul's School, an independent school for boys in London, followed by the University of Cambridge, where he obtained an MA

Life and career
Galsworthy held a variety of posts in the Diplomatic Service, serving as Ambassador to the People's Republic of China from 1997 to 2002. He is the son of Arthur Galsworthy, and was appointed CMG in 1985 and KCMG in 1999.

References 

 ‘GALSWORTHY, Sir Anthony (Charles)’, Who's Who 2011, A & C Black, 2011; online edn, Oxford University Press, December 2010 ; online edn, October 2010 accessed 17 May 2011 doi:10.1093/ww/9780199540884.013.U16695

1944 births
Living people
Ambassadors of the United Kingdom to China
Knights Commander of the Order of St Michael and St George
Principal Private Secretaries to the Secretary of State for Foreign and Commonwealth Affairs
Members of HM Diplomatic Service
20th-century British diplomats